Veit Heiduschka (born 20 May 1938) is an Austrian film producer. He has produced 50 films since 1985. He was nominated for the Academy Award for Best Picture for Amour along with Margaret Ménégoz, Stefan Arndt and Michael Katz in 2013.

Selected filmography
 The Seventh Continent (1989)
 Kinder der Landstrasse (1992)
 Benny's Video (1992)
 The Piano Teacher (2001)
 Everyman's Feast (2002)
 Time of the Wolf (2003)
 Caché (2005)
 For a Moment, Freedom (2008)
 The White Ribbon (2009)
 Amour (2012)

References

External links

1938 births
Living people
Austrian film producers
European Film Awards winners (people)